Eodorcadion zichyi is a species of beetle in the family Cerambycidae. It was described by Csiki in 1901. It is known from Mongolia.

References

Dorcadiini
Beetles described in 1901